George Brinton McClellan Jr.  (August 13, 1908 – July 19, 1982) served as the 13th Commissioner of the Royal Canadian Mounted Police, from November 1, 1963, to August 14, 1967.

Education
In 1929, he graduated from the Royal Military College of Canada in Kingston, Ontario, with a Certificate of Military Qualifications in Cavalry and Infantry.

Career
He joined the Royal Canadian Mounted Police on August 15, 1932. He served across Canada in national security and criminal investigation.

He was appointed Commissioner of the RCMP on November 1, 1963. He chaired two federal-provincial conferences resulting in the expansion of National Police Services, and the Canadian Police College. He terminated equitation training for all recruits but maintained it for the Royal Canadian Mounted Police Musical Ride.

Honours
He was decorated by the Norwegian government with the King Haakon VII Cross of Liberation For his work in training Nordic troops based in Canada during World War II. He was decorated with the St John Ambulance Medal, the 1953 Coronation Medal, the RCMP Long Service Medal with Gold Clasp and the Canadian Centennial Medal. In 1973 he received an Honorary Doctor of Laws from the University of Alberta.

After his retirement from August 14, 1967 – 1974, he served as the first Ombudsman in Canada, serving the Province of Alberta. From 1976 to 1978, he was Chairman of the Rent Regulation Appeal Board of Alberta. He became Chairman of the Alberta Press Council in 1978.
He died on July 19, 1982, in Edmonton, Alberta.

Family
He was born to George Brinton McClellan Sr. and Elizabeth Ann Cunnington in 1908 in Saskatchewan. George McClellan Jr. married Bertha Elizabeth Austin in 1941; they had 3 daughters.

Camp X
George McClellan was a key figure involved in Camp X.

References

 
 
 

1908 births
1982 deaths
People from Moose Jaw
Royal Canadian Mounted Police commissioners
Recipients of the Distinguished Flying Cross (United Kingdom)
Members of the Order of Canada
Canadian Officers of the Order of the British Empire
Members of the Order of Ontario
Royal Military College of Canada alumni